Viscount Hall, of Cynon Valley in the County of Glamorgan, was a title in the Peerage of the United Kingdom. It was created on 28 October 1946 for the Labour politician George Hall.

The title became extinct upon the death of his son, the second Viscount, in 1985. He had married pioneering Leicestershire businesswoman Alice Walker in 1962.

Viscounts Hall (1946)
George Hall, 1st Viscount Hall (1881–1965)
William Hall, 2nd Viscount Hall (1913–1985)

References

Extinct viscountcies in the Peerage of the United Kingdom
Noble titles created in 1946
Noble titles created for UK MPs